is the 13th studio album by Chara, which was released on December 9, 2009. Carol was released in two versions: a limited edition CD+DVD version as well as a regular CD Only version. The DVD will feature documentary footage of Chara recording the album, along with interviews.

The album was preceded by two singles: "Breaking Hearts" and "Kataomoi." "Kataomoi" was used as the ending theme song for the anime Kimi ni Todoke. An album track, "I Miss You," was used in commercials for cosmetics company Orbis' Aqua Force Extra Lotion facial cleanser, which starred Chara herself.

Track listing

Singles

Japan sales rankings

References 
 	

Chara (singer) albums
2009 albums